Heyburn State Park is a public recreation area in the U.S. state of Idaho. It is located almost entirely in Benewah County, with a small portion extending into southern Kootenai County. The park was founded in 1908 and is the oldest state or provincial park in the Pacific Northwest. A dam constructed on the Spokane River in Post Falls in 1906 raised the level of Lake Coeur d'Alene, connecting it to the park's three lakes. The park's year-round recreational opportunities include camping, boating, hiking, horseback riding, fishing, and picnicking.

History
The Coeur d'Alene were the first inhabitants in what is now Heyburn State Park. Originally members called themselves, "Schitsu'umsh," meaning "The Discovered People" or "Those Who Are Found Here." The Natives found an abundance of fish in the three lakes of the park as well as in the Saint Joe River. Waterfowl inhabited the wetlands and deer, bear and various birds were plentiful in the grassy meadows and slopes of the surrounding mountains. Prior to the arrival of European American settlers, the Coeur d'Alene lived in what would become the Idaho Panhandle. The first Europeans to encounter the Coeur d'Alene were French traders and trappers. They found the tribe to be experienced and skilled at trading, thus the name "Coeur d'Alene," meaning "heart of the awl." One French trader described the tribe as "the greatest traders in the world." The tribe ranged over an area of over 4 million acres (16,000 km2) of grassy hills, camas-prairie, wooded mountains, lakes, marshes and river habitat in northern Idaho, eastern Washington and western Montana.

Heyburn had envisioned Chatcolet National Park, which passed the Senate but stalled in the House.

Construction of many of the park's facilities was performed during the Great Depression by the Civilian Conservation Corps. Members at Camp SP-1 built a lodge, roads, bridges, trails, picnic areas and shelters and campgrounds; many are still in use.

Ecology
Heyburn State Park is home to a variety of habitats. Ponderosa pines, some over 400 years old, are on the mountain sides overlooking grassy hills that are covered with wildflowers. Other trees in the park included cedar, hemlock and white pine. The margins of the lake are marshy homes to wildflowers and plants.

Activities and amenities
The  Trail of the Coeur d'Alenes bike trail passes through the park, crossing the Saint Joe River on a  trestle. The river and Hidden Bay, Chatcolet Lake, and Benewah Lake, all sections of the larger Lake Coeur d'Alene, are used for boating, water sports, and fishing. Common game fish include bass, pike and pan fish. The park's marina offers a boat launch, fuel dock, and supplies.

See also
 List of Idaho state parks
 National Parks in Idaho

References

External links

Heyburn State Park Idaho Parks and Recreation
Heyburn State Park Map Idaho Parks and Recreation

State parks of Idaho
Protected areas of Benewah County, Idaho
Protected areas of Kootenai County, Idaho
Protected areas established in 1908
1908 establishments in Idaho
Civilian Conservation Corps in Idaho